Ex delicto, Latin for "from a wrong" or "from a transgression", is a legal term that indicates a consequence of a tort, though the phrase can also refer to the consequence of a crime.  This is often opposed to ex contractu.

See also
Malfeasance
Misfeasance

Latin legal terminology